Zglenicki (feminine: Zglenicka; plural: Zgleniccy) is a Polish surname. Notable people with this surname include:

 Franciszek Zglenicki (1767–1841), Polish Catholic bishop
 Witold Zglenicki (1850–1904), Polish geologist

See also
 

Polish-language surnames